The treujenn-gaol (Breton:  cabbage stalk) is the Breton term for the clarinet as used in Breton music.  The term 'treujenn gaol' was originally a pejorative term invented by bombard players who found the newer instrument encroaching on their livelihood. 

The clarinet arrived in Brittany in the 18th century. The most traditional Breton clarinet is an older type of instrument with 13 or even fewer keys, in contrast to the modern 'Boehm' instrument commonly used in contemporary music in France. Classical musicians in the 19th century discarded older instruments in favor of newer designs from makers such as Boehm, Albert, etc. replacing the formerly ubiquitous 13-key clarinet in the 19th century. These discarded instruments eventually found their way into the hands of folk musicians and the 'treujenn gaol' was born.

After a decline in use in traditional music in the early 20th century, the instrument was revived in the 1970s for use in pairs of instruments (much like the bombard and biniou) and in the music of the bagad.

In Breton music, two clarinetists typically play together, or the clarinet plays with an accordion, though they also play in ensembles with other instruments. The clarinet is a common part of Breton jazz bands, along with saxophones and drums, playing both jazz and traditional songs.

Players
The best-known Breton clarinetists are probably Christian Duro and Erik Marchand, a former member of both Quintet Clarinettes and Gwerz. The bands Termajik, Kentan, Darhaou, Tonnerre de Brest, L'Echo, Cabestan and Strobinell also use clarinets.

Clarinets
Breton musical instruments
Breton words and phrases